The discography of Public Enemy, an American hip hop group, consists of 15 studio albums, two live albums, four compilation albums, two remix albums, one soundtrack album, four video albums, 39 singles, four promotional singles and 39 music videos. The group released their debut studio album, Yo! Bum Rush the Show, in February 1987; it peaked at number 125 on the United States Billboard 200. The album spawned the singles "Public Enemy No. 1" and "You're Gonna Get Yours". Public Enemy released their second studio album, It Takes a Nation of Millions to Hold Us Back, in April 1988. The album peaked at number 42 on the Billboard 200. It has since sold 1.3 million copies in the US, earning a platinum certification from the Recording Industry Association of America (RIAA). Four of the album's singles charted on the US Billboard Hot R&B/Hip-Hop Songs chart: "Bring the Noise", "Don't Believe the Hype", "Night of the Living Baseheads" and "Black Steel in the Hour of Chaos". The former three, along with the single "Rebel Without a Pause", also charted in the United Kingdom.

Fear of a Black Planet, the group's third studio album, was released in April 1990. The album peaked at number 10 on the Billboard 200, with first-week sales of one million copies. Fear of a Black Planet also charted in countries such as Australia, Canada and New Zealand. The album spawned five singles; "Fight the Power" and "911 Is a Joke" both topped the US Billboard Hot Rap Songs chart and charted in countries such as the Netherlands and the UK. "Welcome to the Terrordome", "Brothers Gonna Work It Out" and "Can't Do Nuttin' for Ya Man" all became top 25 hits on the Hot Rap Songs chart and top 40 hits in New Zealand. The group's fourth studio album, Apocalypse 91... The Enemy Strikes Black, was released in October 1991. The album peaked at number four on the Billboard 200; its first single, "Can't Truss It", peaked at number 50 on the US Billboard Hot 100 and gave the band their first hit on the chart. Muse Sick-n-Hour Mess Age followed in August 1994, peaking at number 14 on the Billboard 200. The album's lead single "Give It Up" peaked at number 33 on the Hot 100, becoming the group's most commercially successful single in the United States. In 1998, the group recorded the soundtrack for the film He Got Game. The film's soundtrack album peaked at number 26 on the Billboard 200 and spawned the commercially successful single "He Got Game".

Following a shift of labels from Def Jam Records to Atomic Pop, the group released There's a Poison Goin' On, their sixth studio album. The album only managed to find success in the United Kingdom, where it peaked at number 55 and its only single, "Do You Wanna Go Our Way???", peaked at number 66. Public Enemy then signed to Koch Records, releasing Revolverlution in July 2002. Revolverlution peaked at number 110 on the Billboard 200 and has sold 71,000 copies in the US. The group collaborated with American rapper Paris on their ninth studio album, Rebirth of a Nation, which was released on Paris' own Guerrilla Funk label; it peaked at number 180 on the Billboard 200. How You Sell Soul to a Soulless People Who Sold Their Soul? followed in August 2007 and spawned three singles. "Harder Than You Think", the album's third single, peaked at number 1 in the UK; it became the group's first top ten single in the country. In 2012, the group released two studio albums: Most of My Heroes Still Don't Appear on No Stamp in July and The Evil Empire of Everything in October. In July 2015, the group released their thirteenth album, Man Plans God Laughs. On June 29, 2017, Public Enemy surprise released their fourteenth album, Nothing Is Quick in the Desert. The album was available for free download through Bandcamp until July 4, 2017.

Albums

Studio albums

Live albums

Compilation albums

Remix albums

Soundtrack albums

Video albums

Singles
{| class="wikitable plainrowheaders" style="text-align:center;" border="1"
|+ List of singles, with selected chart positions and certifications, showing year released and album name
! scope="col" rowspan="2" style="width:18em;" | Title
! scope="col" rowspan="2" | Year
! scope="col" colspan="10" | Peak chart positions
! scope="col" rowspan="2" style="width:12em;"| Certifications
! scope="col" rowspan="2" | Album
|-
! scope="col" style="width:3em;font-size:90%;"| US
! scope="col" style="width:3em;font-size:90%;"| USDance
! scope="col" style="width:3em;font-size:90%;"| USR&B
! scope="col" style="width:3em;font-size:90%;"| USRap
! scope="col" style="width:3em;font-size:90%;"| AUS
! scope="col" style="width:3em;font-size:90%;"| FRA
! scope="col" style="width:3em;font-size:90%;"| NLD
! scope="col" style="width:3em;font-size:90%;"| NZ
! scope="col" style="width:3em;font-size:90%;"| SWI
! scope="col" style="width:3em;font-size:90%;"| UK
|-
! scope="row"| "Public Enemy No. 1"
| rowspan="3"| 1987
| — || — || — || — || 68 || — || — || — || — || —
|
| rowspan="2"| Yo! Bum Rush the Show
|-
! scope="row"| "You're Gonna Get Yours"
| — || — || — || — || — || — || — || — || — || 88
|
|-
! scope="row"| "Rebel Without a Pause"
| — || — || — || — || — || — || — || — || — || 37
|
| rowspan="5"| It Takes a Nation of Millions to Hold Us Back
|-
! scope="row"| "Bring the Noise"
| rowspan="3"| 1988
| — || — || 56 || — || — || — || — || — || — || 32
|
|-
! scope="row"| "Don't Believe the Hype"
| — || 21 || 18 || — || — || — || — || 46 || — || 18
|
|-
! scope="row"| "Night of the Living Baseheads"
| — || — || 62 || — || — || — || — || 21 || — || 63
|
|-
! scope="row"| "Black Steel in the Hour of Chaos"
| rowspan="2"| 1989
| — || — || 86 || 11 || — || — || — || — || — || —
|
|-
! scope="row"| "Fight the Power"
| — || — || 20 || 1 || — || — || 24 || — || — || 29
|
| rowspan="5"| Fear of a Black Planet
|-
! scope="row"| "Welcome to the Terrordome"
| rowspan="4"| 1990
| — || 49 || 15 || 3 || 81 || — || 21 || 12 || — || 18
|
|-
! scope="row"| "Brothers Gonna Work It Out"
| — || 31 || 20 || 22 || 95 || — || — || 30 || — || 46
|
|-
! scope="row"| "911 Is a Joke"
| — || — || 15 || 1 || 64 || — || 71 || 22 || 25 || 41
|
|-
! scope="row"| "Can't Do Nuttin' for Ya Man"
| — || — || — || 11 || 59 || — || — || 15 || — || 53
|
|-
! scope="row"| "Can't Truss It"
| rowspan="2"| 1991
| 50 || 5 || 11 || 1 || 55 || — || — || 24 || — || 22
|
 RIAA: Gold
| rowspan="3"| Apocalypse 91... The Enemy Strikes Black
|-
! scope="row"| "Shut 'Em Down"
| — || 16 || 26 || 1 || — || — || — || 30 || — || 21
|
|-
! scope="row"| "Nighttrain"
| rowspan="3"| 1992
| — || — || — || 17 || — || — || — || 42 || — || 55
|
|-
! scope="row"| "Hazy Shade of Criminal"
| — || — || 58 || 12 || — || — || — || 27 || — || —
|
| Greatest Misses
|-
! scope="row"| "Louder Than a Bomb"
| — || — || — || — || — || — || — || — || — || —
|
| It Takes a Nation of Millions to Hold Us Back
|-
! scope="row"| "I Stand Accused"
| 1993
| — || — || — || — || — || — || — || — || — || 77
|
| rowspan="4"| Muse Sick-n-Hour Mess Age
|-
! scope="row"| "Give It Up"
| rowspan="2"| 1994
| 33 || — || 30 || 5 || 16 || 36 || 36 || 14 || 37 || 18
|
|-
! scope="row"| "What Kind of Power We Got?"
| — || — || — || — || — || — || — || — || — || 77
|
|-
! scope="row"| "So Whatcha Gonna Do Now?"
| 1995
| — || — || — || — || — || — || — || — || — || 50
|
|-
! scope="row"| "He Got Game"(featuring Stephen Stills)
| rowspan="3"| 1998
| — || — || 78 || — || 25 || 82 || 54 || 7 || — || 16
|
| rowspan="3"| He Got Game soundtrack
|-
! scope="row"| "Resurrection"(featuring Masta Killa)
| — || — || — || — || — || — || — || — || — || —
|
|-
! scope="row"| "Shake Your Booty"
| — || — || — || — || 66 || — || — || — || — || —
|
|-
! scope="row"| "Do You Wanna Go Our Way???"
| 1999
| — || — || — || — || — || — || — || — || — || 66
|
| There's a Poison Goin' On|-
! scope="row"| "Give the Peeps What They Need"
| 2002
| — || — || — || — || — || — || — || — || — || —
|
| rowspan="2"| Revolverlution
|-
! scope="row"| "Son of a Bush"
| 2003
| — || — || — || — || — || — || — || — || — || —
|
|-
! scope="row"| "Make Love Fuck War"(with Moby)
| 2004
| — || — || — || — || — || — || — || — || — || —
|
| rowspan="2"| New Whirl Odor
|-
! scope="row"| "Bring That Beat Back"
| rowspan="3"| 2005
| — || — || — || — || — || — || — || — || — || —
|
|-
! scope="row"| "Can't Hold Us Back"(featuring Paris, Dead Prez and Kam)
| — || — || — || — || — || — || — || — || — || —
|
| rowspan="2"| Rebirth of a Nation
|-
! scope="row"| "Hell No We Ain't All Right!"(featuring Paris)
| — || — || — || — || — || — || — || — || — || —
|
|-
! scope="row"| "Ali Rap Theme"
| 2006
| — || — || — || — || — || — || — || — || — || —
|
| Non-album single
|-
! scope="row"| "Amerikan Gangster"(featuring E.Infinite)
| rowspan="3"| 2007
| — || — || — || — || — || — || — || — || — || —
|
| rowspan="3"| How You Sell Soul to a Soulless People Who Sold Their Soul?
|-
! scope="row"| "Black Is Back"
| — || — || — || — || — || — || — || — || — || —
|
|-
! scope="row"| "Harder Than You Think"
| — || — || — || — || — || — || — || — || — || 4
|
 BPI: Gold
|-
! scope="row"| "Rise"
| rowspan="2"| 2008
| — || — || — || — || — || — || — || — || — || —
|
| rowspan="2"| Rebirth of a Nation
|-
! scope="row"| "They Call Me Flavor"(featuring Paris)
| — || — || — || — || — || — || — || — || — || —
|
|-
! scope="row"| "Say It Like It Really Is"
| 2010
| — || — || — || — || — || — || — || — || — || —
|
| The Evil Empire of Everything
|-
! scope="row"| "I Shall Not Be Moved"
| 2012
| — || — || — || — || — || — || — || — || — || —
|
| Most of My Heroes Still Don't Appear on No Stamp
|-
! scope="row"| "Man Plans God Laughs"
| 2015
| — || — || — || — || — || — || — || — || — || —
|
| Man Plans God Laughs
|-
! scope="row"| "State of the Union (STFU)" (featuring DJ Premier) 
| rowspan="2"| 2020
| — || — || — || — || — || — || — || — || — || —
|
| rowspan="2"| What You Gonna Do When the Grid Goes Down? 	
|-
! scope="row"| "Fight the Power: Remix 2020" (featuring Nas, Rapsody, Black Thought, Jahi, YG and Questlove)
| — || — || — || — || — || — || — || — || — || —
|
|-
| colspan="14" style="font-size:90%" | "—" denotes a recording that did not chart or was not released in that territory.
|}

Promotional singles

Other appearances

Music videos

NotesA   "I Stand Accused" and "What Kind of Power We Got?" charted as a double A-side single in the United Kingdom.B  "911 Is a Joke" did not enter the Billboard Hot 100, but peaked at number one on the Bubbling Under Hot 100 Singles chart, which lists the top 25 singles that have yet to reach the Hot 100.C'''  "He Got Game" did not enter the Billboard'' Hot 100, but peaked at number five on the Bubbling Under Hot 100 Singles chart, which lists the top 25 singles that have yet to reach the Hot 100.

References

External links
 Official website
 Public Enemy at AllMusic
 
 

Hip hop discographies
Discographies of American artists
discography